Michael McBroom (born May 16, 1991) is an American swimmer who specializes in long-distance freestyle events. He is a FINA World Championships silver medalist in the 800-meter freestyle and formerly held the American Record in the 800-meter freestyle.

Swimming career

2012
In 2012, McBroom missed out on making the Olympic Team by placing 7th in the 1500-meter freestyle and 8th in the 400-meter freestyle.

2013
At the 2013 Phillips National Championships, which also served as the selection meet for the 2013 World Aquatics Championships, McBroom placed 4th in the 400-meter freestyle, and 2nd in the 800-meter and 1500-meter freestyle, qualifying for the World Championships.

McBroom broke out onto the international stage after capturing the silver medal in the 800-meter freestyle at the 2013 World Aquatics Championships with a time of 7:43.60, breaking the American Record in the process.

References

External links
 
 
  Michael McBroom – University of Texas athlete profile at TexasSports.com

1991 births
Living people
American male freestyle swimmers
Texas Longhorns men's swimmers
People from Plymouth, Minnesota
Sportspeople from Minnesota
Sportspeople from the Minneapolis–Saint Paul metropolitan area
World Aquatics Championships medalists in swimming